ABC Stores is a  chain of convenience stores based in Honolulu. The chain operates 73 stores, 57 of which are located in the state of Hawaii, with the remaining locations in the Mariana Islands and Las Vegas and Guam. The company now generates more than $230 million in annual sales and employs over 1500 staff, and is described as the 37th largest company in Hawaii.

The company also has 7 stores operating under the Island Deli brand, with a focus on groceries and fresh foods. In 2017 they opened a restaurant and food hall known as the Dukes Lane Eatery in Waikiki.

Products
The stores sell convenience items such as groceries, as well as tourist items and souvenirs. The chain's best-selling items are tourist-oriented products such as Macadamia nuts, sunscreen and sunglasses.

History
The chain was started by Sidney Kosasa, who opened his first store in Waikiki in 1964.  The stores were originally named "Mister K."  Later, in order to make the store name easier to remember, the name of the stores were changed to "ABC Stores." The last Mister K was changed to ABC in 2009.

The son of a first generation Japanese immigrant, Sidney Kosasa (or rather ‘Mr. K’-  known by his ABC Stores ‘Ohana’ or family) was born in Palolo Valley, Hawaii in December 1919.  His first experiences in retail began while working in his parents’ grocery store in Palolo.

In 1949, Mr. and Mrs. K. opened their first pharmacy/convenience store in Kaimuki, Hawaii – known later as Thrifty Drugs.  As business grew, his entrepreneurial and business philosophies resulted in the opening of four locations within 10 years. While attending a business convention in Miami Beach, Florida, Mr. K noticed all the tourists near the large hotels and had a vision to build a chain of resort stores in Hawaii. The first ABC Store was opened on Kalakaua Avenue in Waikiki, Hawaii in 1964.

References

External links
ABC Stores of Hawaii

Companies based in Honolulu
Convenience stores of the United States
Business in Hawaii
1964 establishments in Hawaii
Retail companies established in 1964
Grocery stores in Hawaii
American companies established in 1964
Retail companies based in Hawaii